Fallston Airport  is an airport located southeast of Fallston, Maryland, United States.

History 
The airport is built adjacent to the historic Reed farm.

References

External links 
 YouTube video of Fallston Airport

Airports in Maryland
Airports established in 1960
Transportation buildings and structures in Harford County, Maryland
1960 establishments in Maryland